The Fairhall River is a river in the Marlborough region of New Zealand. It arises near Blairich Pass and flows north-east to join the Ōpaoa River between Renwick and Blenheim. The locality of Fairhall is east of the river. The river and locality were named in 1847 for a chainman in a survey team in the area.

A vineyard, Fairhall Downs, was established in the river valley in 1982.

See also
List of rivers of New Zealand

References

Land Information New Zealand - Search for Place Names

Rivers of the Marlborough Region
Rivers of New Zealand